Ananda Pathak was an Indian politician. He was elected to the Lok Sabha, the lower house of the Parliament of India from Darjeeling, West Bengal as a member of the Communist Party of India (Marxist). Earlier he was a member of the upper house of the Parliament of India, the Rajya Sabha and West Bengal Legislative Assembly.

Personal life
Pathak was born to Kamala Kanta Pathak in Haridas Hatta in Darjeeling district, Bengal Presidency of British India. He married Soumati Pathak in June 1964, with whom he had two sons. He died in December 2014.

References

External links
Official biographical sketch in Parliament of India website

1930 births
2014 deaths
India MPs 1980–1984
India MPs 1984–1989
India MPs 1998–1999
Lok Sabha members from West Bengal
Rajya Sabha members from West Bengal
People from Darjeeling